Giatto is an unincorporated community in Mercer County, West Virginia, United States.

The community was named after Giotto, an Italian artist (a recording error by postal officials accounts for the error in spelling, which was never corrected).

References

Unincorporated communities in Mercer County, West Virginia
Unincorporated communities in West Virginia
Coal towns in West Virginia